PMW frequently refers to the Polish Navy (Polska Marynarka Wojenna).

PMW may also refer to:

 Posted Memory Writes
 Palestine Media Watch
 Palestinian Media Watch
 Palmas Airport, Brazil; IATA airport code PMW
 Paramount Airways, India; ICAO airline code PMW
 Passive microwave sensor (PMW sensor)
 Penmaenmawr railway station, England; National Rail station code PMW
 Philip's Music Writer, a music scorewriter
 Panglima Mahkota Wilayah, a Malaysian award
 "PMW (All I Really Need)", a 2013 song by ASAP Rocky